Blumenthal is an unincorporated farming and ranching community on the Pedernales River in Gillespie County, in the U.S. state of Texas. It is located halfway between Fredericksburg and Stonewall on U.S. Highway 290, near the intersection of Jung Lane. The community was believed to have been settled about 1900, and reached its peak population of 25 in 1945.

Nearby businesses are a bed-and-breakfast concern, and Wildseed Farms.

References

Unincorporated communities in Texas
Unincorporated communities in Gillespie County, Texas
Ghost towns in Central Texas